The WXW Ultimate Heavyweight Championship is a professional wrestling championship in the American independent professional wrestling promotion World Xtreme Wrestling. Lance Anoa'i is the current champion in his second reign, he beat Bo Nekoda on July 12, 2015 at a WXW house show for the championship. There have been 18 WXW Ultimate Heavyweight Championship reigns and 13 total champions with one vacancy.

Title history
Key

List of combined reigns

See also
 WXW Heavyweight Championship

References

External links
WXW C4's official website.

Heavyweight wrestling championships
World Xtreme Wrestling championships